Camillo Müller (8 January 1870 – 28 September 1936) was an Austrian sabre fencer who competed in the 1900 Summer Olympics.

In the 1900 sabre competition he reached the final and finished eighth.

References

External links

1870 births
1936 deaths
Austrian male sabre fencers
Fencers at the 1900 Summer Olympics
Olympic fencers of Austria
Place of birth missing
Place of death missing